Bentivoglio is an Italian surname. Notable people with the surname include:

 Annibale Bentivoglio (disambiguation), multiple people, including:
Annibale I Bentivoglio (1415–1445), absolute ruler of the Italian city of Bologna
Annibale II Bentivoglio (1467–1540), Italian condottiero who was shortly lord of Bologna
Annibale Bentivoglio (archbishop) (died 1663), Italian Roman Catholic archbishop
 Antongaleazzo Bentivoglio (c. 1385–1435), Italian condottiero who was executed by the papacy for treason
 Cornelio Bentivoglio (1668–1732), Italian nobleman and cardinal
 Ermes Bentivoglio (1475–1513), Italian condottiero
 Fabrizio Bentivoglio (born 1957), Italian cinema and theatre actor and screenwriter
 Giovanni Bentivoglio (disambiguation), multiple people, including:
Giovanni I Bentivoglio (died 1402), first ruler of Bologna from the Bentivoglio family
Giovanni II Bentivoglio (1443–1508), Italian nobleman
 Girolamo Bentivoglio (died 1601), Roman Catholic prelate
 Guido Bentivoglio (1579–1644), Italian cardinal, statesman and historian
 Ippolito II Bentivoglio (1611–1685), Italian nobleman
 Maria Francesca Bentivoglio (born 1977), Italian tennis player
 Mary Magdalen Bentivoglio (1834–1905), Italian nun of the Order of St. Clare
 Mirella Bentivoglio (1922–2017), Italian sculptor, poet, performance artist and curator
 Sante Bentivoglio (1426–1462), Italian nobleman who ruled as tyrant of Bologna
 Sean Bentivoglio (born 1985), Canadian ice hockey forward
 Simone Bentivoglio (born 1985), Italian football midfielder
 Vittoria Bentivoglio (16th century), Italian singer

Italian-language surnames